Pimlico State High School is an independent public high school in Townsville, Australia.

Basic information

Established in 1959, Pimlico State High School is now one of the largest public high schools in North Queensland. Following the transition of Year 7 from primary schools to high schools across Queensland in 2015, the total enrolments of Pimlico have grown to approximately 1700. While operated as part of the Queensland Department of Education, Pimlico was awarded Independent Public School (IPS) status in 2013. Under the IPS program, Pimlico operates semi-autonomously with oversight provided by a School Council.

The school draws approximately half of its enrolments from outside its designated catchment area. Because of the strong demand for places at the school, Pimlico is designated as an 'enrolment managed' school and has an Enrolment Management Plan that sets the parameters for prioritising and accepting enrolments from outside of the school's catchment. Students can apply for enrolment as part of the school's Excellence Programs in Music, Performing Arts and Academics.

The school is accredited with the Council of International Schools (CIS).

Pimlico offers a broad curriculum. While the school's reputation within the community is built on the school's strong academic focus and its extensive music programs and related curricular offerings, the school provides a wide range of pathways and opportunities that cater to a diverse range of students. This includes a range of vocational certificates and courses as well as a wide range of sporting and cultural opportunities. More recently, the school has developed programs with a focus on global citizenship and leadership.

The current head of school is Executive Principal, Joel Buchholz. The Executive Principal is supported by a Principal and four Deputy Principals and each of these senior leaders oversee a specific portfolio area within the school. A team of approximately fifteen Heads of Department lead different faculties or significant programs areas within the school. The majority of these Heads of Department lead curriculum-based faculty areas, such as Mathematics or The Arts, while a small number have responsibility for school-wide programs or initiatives such as Teaching and Learning or Student Development. There are approximately 120 teaching staff and 60 non-teaching staff at Pimlico. While the School Council provides broad strategic oversight, a Parents and Citizens Association provides further opportunities for parental input and involvement.

Notable alumni

 Jarrod Bannister - Australian representative to 2012 Olympics in Javelin
 Mitchell Johnson - Australian Test/One Day & 20/20 Cricketer
 Luke Kennedy - Runner-up The Voice Australia Season 2 (2013)
 Aaron Payne - North Queensland Cowboys Rugby League
 Russell Hamilton CBE - Director of Research and Development at the United Kingdom Department of Health 
 John Buttigieg - North Queensland Cowboys / Queensland State of Origin Rugby League
 Russell Baker AM - Commodore, Royal Australian Navy, President Mountain Bike Australia 2009-2017
 Milton Thaiday - NSW Waratahs Rugby Union & Newcastle Knights Rugby League
 Gorden Tallis - Former Captain of Brisbane Broncos / Queensland State of Origin / Australian National Rugby League Team (Kangaroos)
 Mitch Norton - basketball player
 Anna Reynolds - Lord Mayor of Hobart
 Harry Froling - basketball player/2019 NBL Rookie of the Year

References

External links
 Official website
 Pimlico's YAA team website 2007

Public high schools in Queensland
Schools in Townsville
Educational institutions established in 1959
1959 establishments in Australia